Children's Aid, formerly the Children's Aid Society, is a private child welfare nonprofit in New York City founded in 1853 by Charles Loring Brace. With an annual budget of over $100 million, 45 citywide sites, and over 1,200 full-time employees, Children's Aid is one of America's oldest and largest children's nonprofits.

Children's Aid helps tens of thousands of disadvantaged New York City children succeed annually, by providing comprehensive services of adoption and foster care, after-school and weekend programs, arts, camps, early childhood education, events, family support, medical, mental health, and dental, juvenile justice, legal advocacy, special initiatives, sports and recreation, and youth development programs.

History

In 1853, Children's Aid was founded by Yale College graduate and philanthropist, Charles Loring Brace, with financial support from New York businessmen and philanthropists, to ensure the physical and emotional well-being of children, and provide them with the support needed to become successful adults. Brace was appalled by the thousands of abandoned, abused, and orphaned children living in the slums and on the streets of New York at the time. The only options available to such children at the time were begging, prostitution, petty thievery, and gang membership, or commitment to jails, almshouses, and orphanages.

Brace believed that institutional care stunted and destroyed children. His view was only work, education, and a strong family life could help them develop into self-reliant citizens. Brace knew that American pioneers could use help settling the American West, and arranged to send the orphaned children to them. This became known as the Orphan Train Movement. The children were encouraged to break completely with the past and would arrive in a town where community leaders  assembled interested townspeople for inspection and selection.

The program was controversial, as some abolitionists viewed it as a form of slavery, while pro-slavery advocates saw it part of the abolitionist movement, since the labor provided by the children made slaves unnecessary. Some Catholics deemed the program to be anti-Catholic, since a significant percentage of poor children in Manhattan were Irish Catholic, and would be raised outside of their faith once transported into the interior of the country. In response, the Archdiocese of New York upgraded their own child-welfare programs, improving the parochial school system, building more Catholic orphanages, and creating a 114-acre (46-hectare) training center on farmland in the Bronx, which they called the Catholic Protectory.

From 1854 to the last train in 1929, more than 200,000 children rode the "Orphan Train" to new lives. The Orphan Train Heritage Society maintains an archive of riders' stories. The National Orphan Train Museum in Concordia, Kansas maintains records and also houses a research facility.

Development

Other child welfare innovations
Since originating the Orphan Train in 1853, Children's Aid has founded a series of child welfare innovations that have since become commonplace, such as:
 some of the first industrial schools
 the first parent-teacher associations
 the first free school lunch programs
 the first free dental clinics for children
 the first day schools for handicapped children
 the first kindergarten in the United States
 the first foster homes
 the first “fresh air” vacations, in which urban children visit host families in the country for the summer.
toy drives for children during the holidays

In the 1980s Children's Aid created the first family court diversion programs, where social workers meet with out-of-control children and their families in an attempt to find out of court solutions.

In 1992, Children's Aid created the first "community school", a partnership with the New York City Department of Education where a full array of health, mental and after-school, weekend and summer programs are available to students at school. The Technical Assistance Center has helped visitors from all over the United States and more than 40 foreign countries learn how to apply "community school" concepts in their schools.

In 2009, it was honored with a Village Award from the Greenwich Village Society for Historic Preservation for its Philip Coltoff Center in Greenwich Village (since razed for new residential development). In 2012, Children's Aid was rated 4/4 stars by charities rating organization Charity Navigator for a record-breaking 12th consecutive year.

Leadership
In 1912, Charles Loring Brace Jr. was re-elected board secretary of the society founded by his father. Board Chair Emeriti include Edward Lamont Sr. and Edgar Koerner, with over thirty notable board members.

In 2014, the Children's Aid board of trustees appointed Phoebe C. Boyer as its eleventh President and CEO and first female leader.

In popular culture
 Christina Baker Kline's "Orphan Train, a novel", a 2013 historical fiction which features main character Vivian Daly (Niamh) as a 9 year old Irish immigrant abandoned in New York after a family tragedy who is placed on board the train heading to Minnesota in 1929 by Children's Aid. Her journey through several foster homes to adulthood is shared with Molly, a present-day 17-year-old in foster care with her own issues with whom she forges a friendship.
 Kate Manning's My Notorious Life (2014) predominantly features as main characters 1800s orphans who get selected from the street among children who must prostitute themselves for food by Charles Loring Brace for the Orphan Train, and eventually become Lake Shore Drive (Chicago) and Fifth Avenue residents.
The book "Last Train Home, an orphan train story" by Renée Wendinger is a historical novella describing the methods by which children were placed by the Children's Aid and the New York Foundling following the lives of two children of the train.
The book "Extra! Extra! The Orphan Trains and Newsboys of New York" by Renée Wendinger is an unabridged nonfiction resource book and pictorial history about the orphan trains. 
The song by Utah Phillips called "Orphan Train" has been performed by numerous modern bluegrass singers.
The book Gratefully Yours describes a nine-year-old girl's feelings about her new family who adopt her from the orphan train.
There is a ballet entitled Orphan Train presented by Covenant Ballet Theatre of Brooklyn, which tells the story of Brace and shows stories of orphans on the train.
Authors Al and Joanna Lacy have written an Orphan Trains Trilogy, depicting the lives of fictional orphans.
The ballad "Rider On An Orphan Train", written by David Massengill, describes the inevitable tragedy of the separation of siblings in spite of the efforts to keep brothers and sisters together.
The book Train to Somewhere by Eve Bunting describes a fictional account of a girl's journey on the Orphan Train.

See also
 Timeline of children's rights in the United States

References

External links
 Official website
 The Records of Children's Aid 1836-2006 at the New-York Historical Society
Digitized Records of the Children's Aid Society at the New-York Historical Society.

1853 establishments in New York (state)
1853 establishments in the United States
Organizations established in 1853
Non-profit organizations based in New York City
Charities based in New York City
Children's charities based in the United States
Social care in the United States